Rahul Banerjee (Bengali:রাহুল ব্যানার্জি, born 1978) is an Indian organic chemist and a professor at the department of chemical sciences of the Indian Institute of Science Education and Research, Kolkata. Banerjee, a fellow of the Royal Society of Chemistry, is known for his studies in the field of Metal–organic framework designing. The Council of Scientific and Industrial Research, the apex agency of the Government of India for scientific research, awarded him the Shanti Swarup Bhatnagar Prize for Science and Technology, one of the highest Indian science awards, for his contributions to chemical sciences in 2018. Currently he is one of the associate editor of international peer-review journal Journal of the American Chemical Society.

Biography 

Rahul Banerjee, born on 22 March 1978 in the Indian state of West Bengal, graduated in chemistry with honors from the University of Calcutta in 1998 and continued at the institution to earn a master's degree from the prestigious Rajabazar Science College campus in 2000. His doctoral studies were at the University of Hyderabad under the guidance of TWAS laureate, Gautam Radhakrishna Desiraju, and he received his PhD in crystal engineering and supramolecular chemistry in the year 2006. Subsequently, he moved to the US to do his post-doctoral work at the laboratory of Omar M. Yaghi at the University of California, Los Angeles and on his return to India in 2008, he joined the National Chemical Laboratory, Pune (NCL) as a scientist at grade C. At the time his next move to the Indian Institute of Science Education and Research, Kolkata (IISER) in 2017, he was an E-1 grade scientist at NCL. At IISER, he holds the position of an associate professor and heads the Porous Materials Laboratory (PMATLAB) where he hosts a number of researchers.

Research and contributions 
Banerjee focuses his research on designing Metal–organic frameworks for improved gas uptake property and is known to have contributed to the field of structural chemistry with regard to applications in hydrogen storage and carbon capture. He has published a number of articles. ResearchGate, an online repository of scientific articles has listed 165 of them. He has participated in several scientific events including the Royal Society of Chemistry Roadshow 2017 held at the National Chemical Laboratory, Pune where he was one of the keynote speakers. He is also an associate editor of CrystEngComm, the biweekly journal of the Royal Society of Chemistry.

Awards and honors 
During his days at the University of California, Los Angeles, in 2008, Banerjee received two honors, viz. the Post Doctoral Recognition Award and the Amgen Post Doctoral Award, both awarded by the Department of Chemistry and Biochemistry of the university. The Indian Academy of Sciences selected him as a Young Associate in 2009 and he received two Young Scientist awards in 2011, the NASI-Young Scientist Platinum Jubilee Award and the CSIR Young Scientist Award. Banerjee, who has received the fellowship of the Royal Society of Chemistry, was honored again by the National Academy of Sciences, India and Elsevier in 2014 with the NASI-SCOPUS Young Scientist Award and a year later, he received the Thomson Reuters Research Excellence-India Citation Award. The same year, he received the 2015 B. M. Birla Science Prize in Chemistry and he was selected for the Swarnajayanti Fellowship of the Department of Science and Technology in 2016. The Council of Scientific and Industrial Research awarded him the Shanti Swarup Bhatnagar Prize, one of the highest Indian science awards in 2018.

Selected bibliography

See also 

 Covalent organic framework
 Determining hydrogen storage capacity

Notes

References

External links 
 
 

Recipients of the Shanti Swarup Bhatnagar Award in Chemical Science
Indian scientific authors
Living people
Scientists from West Bengal
Academic staff of the Indian Institutes of Science Education and Research
1978 births
University of Calcutta alumni
University of Hyderabad alumni
University of California, Los Angeles alumni
Fellows of the Royal Society of Chemistry